

Events

February events
 February 4 – The Cincinnati, Wilmington and Zanesville Railroad is incorporated in Ohio.
 February 7 – The Chicago & Rock Island Railroad, the earliest predecessor of the Chicago, Rock Island and Pacific Railroad, is incorporated.
 February 10 – The Illinois Central Railroad is chartered.
 February 25 – The first passenger train on the Milwaukee Road operates over what is then known as the Milwaukee and Mississippi Railroad between Milwaukee, Wisconsin, and Wauwatosa, Wisconsin.

April events 
 April 19 – The Albany and Susquehanna Railroad, in New York state, is chartered.

May events
 May 17 – Opening of first railway in Peru, linking the Pacific port of Callao and the capital Lima ( of standard gauge), later part of the Ferrocarril del Centro.

June events 
 June – The first "refrigerated boxcar" enters service on the Northern Railroad (New York).

July events
 July 4 – Groundbreaking ceremonies are held for the Pacific Railroad Company, a railroad later to become the Missouri Pacific Railroad

August events 
 August 2 – The Staten Island Railway is incorporated.

November events 
 November 1 – Saint Petersburg–Moscow Railway officially opened in Russia.

December events 
 December 22 – The first railway operates in India, hauling construction material in Roorkee.
 December 25 – Opening of first railway in Chile, from Caldera to Copiapó ( of standard gauge climbing.

Unknown date events
 The oldest line to become a part of the Southern Pacific Railroad system, the Buffalo Bayou, Brazos and Colorado Railway begins construction between Houston, Texas, and Alleyton, Texas.
 The Mohawk and Hudson Railroad changes its name to the Mohawk Valley Railroad.

Births

March births 
 March 1 – Edward Ponsonby, director for London, Brighton and South Coast Railway beginning in 1895 and chairman of same 1908–1920 (died 1920).

June births
 June 24 – Stuyvesant Fish, president of the Illinois Central Railroad 1887–1907 (died 1923).

September births 
 September 16 – Henry Ivatt, Chief Mechanical Engineer of the Great Northern Railway (Great Britain) 1896–1911 (died 1923).

October births 
 October 5 – Frank W. Arnold, a Grand Master and Secretary-Treasurer of the Brotherhood of Locomotive Firemen, is born (died 1917).

Deaths

References